Anguidae refers to a large and diverse family of lizards native to the Northern Hemisphere. Common characteristics of this group include a reduced supratemporal arch, striations on the medial faces of tooth crowns, osteoderms, and a lateral fold in the skin of most taxa.  The group includes the slowworms, glass lizards, and alligator lizards, among others. The family is divided into two subfamilies (Anguinae and Gerrhonotinae), and contains about 87 species in 8 genera.

Morphology and reproduction 

Anguids have hard osteoderms beneath their scales giving them an armored appearance. Many of the species have reduced or absent limbs, giving them a snake-like appearance, while others are fully limbed. Body type varies among species, with sizes ranging from 10 cm to 1.5 m. The group includes oviparous and viviparous species, both of which can be observed in a single genus at times.

Feeding and habitat 

These lizards are known carnivorous or insectivorous foragers, feeding primarily on insects, although larger species have been known to feed on small reptiles and amphibians. They inhabit a wide range of different habitats across the globe, from arid to tropical environments. Most known species are terrestrial or semifossorial, with the exception of one arboreal genus: Abronia.

Evolution 

Anguids have a relatively good fossil record and are relatively common as fossils in the Late Cretaceous and Paleogene of western North America. The oldest known anguid, with the most complete fossil record of any lizard, is Odaxosaurus, a member of the extinct anguid subfamily Glyptosaurinae, from the late Campanian of Canada, about 75 million years ago. Odaxosaurus and other Late Cretaceous anguids already exhibit many features found in living anguids, including chisel-like teeth and armor plates in the skin, suggesting a long evolutionary history for the group. Anguids were particularly diverse during the Paleocene and Eocene in North America; some species, such as those belonging to Glyptosaurinae,  grew to large size and evolved a highly specialized crushing dentition. The long fossil record for the Anguidae in North America suggests that the group probably evolved in North America during the Cretaceous before dispersing to Europe in the Paleogene.

Classification
Family ANGUIDAE
 Subfamily Anguinae
 Genus Anguis - slowworms (five species)
 Genus Dopasia - Asian glass lizards (seven species)
 Genus Hyalosaurus - North African glass lizard (one species)
 Genus Ophisaurus - American glass lizards (five species)
 Genus Pseudopus - scheltopusik (one extant species)
 Subfamily Gerrhonotinae - alligator lizards
 Genus Barisia - alligator lizards (seven species)
 Genus Gerrhonotus - alligator lizards (seven species)
 Genus Abronia - arboreal alligator lizards (37 species)
 Genus Elgaria - western alligator lizards (seven species)
Subfamily †Glyptosaurinae
Genetic evidence indicates that Diploglossinae lies outside the clade containing Anguinae, Gerrhonotinae, and the family Anniellidae, Therefore it has been placed in own separate family Diploglossidae.

References

External links

 List of species in the family Anguidae from the Reptile Database
 http://animaldiversity.org/accounts/Anguidae/

Anguids
Taxa named by John Edward Gray
Lizard families
Extant Campanian first appearances